Pelton is a suburb located 5 km south west of the centre of the Hunter Region town of Cessnock, New South Wales, Australia. Most properties face onto Ellalong Road, which is the eastern access to Werakata State Conservation Area, previously  Aberdare State Forest.

References

Suburbs of City of Cessnock